Alliance of Change was a coalition in the Albanian parliamentary election in 2009.

Coalition
Democratic Party of Albania (PD)
Republican Party of Albania (PR)
Environmentalist Agrarian Party (PAA)
Democratic Alliance Party (PAD)
Legality and Unity of the Right (PLL)
Democratic National Front Party (PBKD)
National Front Party (PBK)
Liberal Democratic Union (BLD)
Party for Justice and Integration (PDI)
Christian Democratic League (LDK)
Democratic Alliance Party (AD)
Democratic National Front Party (PBKD)
Party of New Albanian European Democracy (PRDESh)
New Party of Denied Rights (PDMR)
Macedonian Alliance for European Integration (AMIE)
Alliance for Democracy and Solidarity (ADS)
Ora of Albania (POSh)
Forca Albania (PFA)

References

Politics of Albania
Political organizations based in Albania